Wētā is a common name for a group of about 70 species of insects endemic to New Zealand, mostly in the family Anostostomatidae.

Weta, Wetas, wētā or WETA may also refer to:

Places
 Weta, Ghana, a village in Volta Region, Ghana, also known as Wheta
 Weta, South Dakota, an unincorporated community in Jackson County, South Dakota, United States

Media
 WETA (FM), a radio station licensed to Washington, D.C., United States
 WETA-TV, a television station licensed to Washington, D.C., United States
 Wētā FX, a digital visual effects company (formerly known as Weta Digital)
 Wētā Workshop, a special effects and prop company

Transportation and vehicles
 Wētā Trimaran, a dinghy
 Weta ferry, San Francisco Bay, California, USA
 San Francisco Bay Area Water Emergency Transportation Authority

Other uses
 Weta (genus), in the family Rhaphidophoridae; an obsolete name for the genus Pleioplectron
 Weta (band) (1995–2001), a New Zealand rock band

See also